Jacob Artist (born October 17, 1992) is an American actor, singer, and dancer. He is best known for his roles as Jake Puckerman on the Fox musical comedy-drama series Glee and as Brandon Fletcher on the ABC drama-thriller series Quantico.

Early life
Artist was born in Buffalo, New York to Darrell and Judith Artist, and grew up in Williamsville, New York. His father is African American, while his mother is of Polish descent. He has a younger sister named Jenna. He took lessons through the Community Music School in Buffalo, New York.

In 2010, Artist graduated from Williamsville South High School a semester early, and was accepted into the Juilliard School for dance. However, he turned Juilliard down to pursue an acting career.

Career
After high school graduation, Artist moved to Los Angeles, where he appeared in an episode of Bucket & Skinner's Epic Adventures and in the television film Blue Lagoon: The Awakening. In July 2012, he was cast in the Fox musical comedy-drama series Glee as Jake Puckerman, the younger half-brother of Noah "Puck" Puckerman. He began appearing in the fourth season premiere, and was upgraded to the main cast for the fifth season. At the series' conclusion in 2015, he had featured in 36 episodes.

In 2015, Artist joined the ABC drama-thriller series Quantico, playing the role of Brandon Fletcher, an FBI recruit at the training academy in Quantico, Virginia. Artist guest starred as Todd Connors in the ninth episode of the FX horror anthology series American Horror Story: Roanoke. He then starred alongside John Cusack and Ellar Coltrane in the thriller film Blood Money. Artist has a recurring role in the second season of The Arrangement as Wes Blaker.

In 2019, Artist appeared in a recurring role as Isaac in the Starz surreal comedy series Now Apocalypse from pioneering New Queer Cinema filmmaker Gregg Araki. This was the third collaboration between Artist and Araki following his 2014 appearance in Araki's White Bird in a Blizzard as well as the 2015 short film Here Now. He then starred alongside former Quantico co-star Johanna Braddy in the 2020 coming-of-age comedy The Get Together.

Filmography

Film

Television

References

External links
 
 
 

1992 births
21st-century American male actors
African-American male dancers
African-American dancers
American male film actors
21st-century African-American male singers
American people of Polish descent
American male dancers
African-American male actors
American male television actors
Living people
Male actors from Buffalo, New York
People from Williamsville, New York
Musicians from Buffalo, New York
21st-century American male singers
21st-century American singers